St. Adalbert Parish - designated for Polish immigrants in Providence, Rhode Island, United States.

History
The parish was founded in 1902. It is one of the oldest Polish-American Roman Catholic parishes in New England in the Diocese of Providence.

Building
The church was designed by the eminent architect Henry F. Ludorf of Hartford, CT.

See also
 Catholic Church in the United States
 Catholic parish church
 Index of Catholic Church articles
 Pastoral care

Bibliography 
 
 
 
 The Official Catholic Directory in USA

External links 
Official site of the Holy See
 Parish Website
 St. Adalbert - Diocesan information
 St. Adalbert - ParishesOnline.com

Churches in the Roman Catholic Diocese of Providence
Polish-American culture in Rhode Island
Polish-American Roman Catholic parishes in New England
Churches in Providence, Rhode Island
Roman Catholic parishes and churches in Rhode Island